Col. Richard Lee II (1647–1715) was a planter, politician and military officer for Westmoreland County, Virginia, who served in both Houses of the Virginia General Assembly and was captured during Bacon's Rebellion.

Early life 

Born at "Paradise" plantation in Northumberland County, Virginia, to the former Anne Constable (ca. 1621–1666) and her merchant planter husband Col. Richard Lee I, "the Immigrant" (1618–1664).  

He was educated at Oxford in England and may have studied law at the London Inns of Court.  He seemed destined for a career in the church, but he elected rather to return to the life of a Virginia gentleman, residing at "Paradise".  In 1673, when his older brother John died unmarried, Richard inherited what had been his father's main estate, "Machodoc", and his two younger sons Thomas and Henry (who under primogeniture would receive little after his death, inherited specific property (some in Dorchester County, Maryland under the terms of Richard's will. Richard left "Paradise" to overseers and moved to his new estate.

Career 
Upon his father's death, and later his brother John's death, he inherited considerable acreage in multiple Virginia counties.

Soon after his marriage, Richard won election to the House of Burgesses, and won re-election once. In 1676, Richard became a member of the legislature's upper house, the [[Virginia Governor's Council|King's Council] and he served in this capacity off and on until 1698. The Council also served as the Governor's privy council and the colony's Supreme Court. On one such absence in 1690, he had lost his seat because of his refusal to take the oath of allegiance to William III, King of England ("William of Orange") (1650–1702). However, he was reinstated within a year. Richard ultimately retired from that position because of ill health.

As early as 1680 he had accepted appointment as militia colonel for Westmoreland and adjoining (but later subdivided) Northumberland and Stafford counties. A more lucrative appointment he received during the term of Gov. Edmund Andros (1637–1714) was that of "Naval Officer and Receiver of Virginia Dutys for the River Potomac", for which he received 10% of the export duties collected.

Richard established his residence at the "Machodoc" plantation, then on the Potomac River in Westmoreland county, near the modern town of Hague in Westmoreland County. Pursuant to primogeniture, the large brick house, largely enclosed by a brick wall, would be inherited by his son Richard Lee III (1679–1718) who resided in London with his family, and was a merchant in the tobacco trade. However, around the time of this man's death, the mercantile firm of Corbin and Lee faced significant financial problems. Nonetheless, Richard III leased his estate in Virginia to his youngest, brothers, Thomas, Hon. (1690–1750) and Henry (1691–1747), for "an annual rent of one peppercorn only, payable on Christmas Day".

Death 
Richard survived his wife Laetitia by almost eight years, dying March 12, 1714, at "Machodoc" in Westmoreland County. His will was probated on April 27, 1715. He was buried at what slightly more than a decade later became known as the old "Burnt House Fields", the family graveyard located near "Mount Pleasant".  Laetitia's tombstone can still be seen there.

After Richard's death in 1718, his London-based widow, Martha Silk,  sold her interest to the resident brother, Colonel Thomas Lee. However, arsonist thieves burned the house down on January 29, 1729, which prompted Thomas (after receiving some compensation for his loss from the government and queen) to build Stratford Hall. 

Upon reaching legal age and arriving in Virginia, Richard Lee III's only son, Col. George Lee (1714–1761), built another new plantation house, which he called "Mount Pleasant". Although built further back from the river and upon higher ground, it also later burned down.

Personal life 

Richard II, had one of the largest libraries in the Colony. He spent almost his whole life in study, and usually wrote his notes in Greek, Hebrew, or Latin.  It was because of this that he was termed "Richard the scholar".  Richard was a supporter of the Established Church. Richard married Laetitia Corbin (ca. 1657–1706), daughter of Richard's neighbor and member of the Governor's Council, Henry Corbin, Sr. (1629–1676) and his wife Alice (Eltonhead) Burnham (ca. 1627–1684). Laetitia's sister was Anne Corbin Tayloe.

 John Lee (21 May 1678 – 1679), who died in infancy.
 Richard Lee III  (12 Jul. 1679–31 Dec. 1718), who married Martha Silk (23 Jan. 1679-23 Jan. 1734).
 Capt. and Justice of the Peace Philip Corbin Lee  (1681–1744) who married 1) Sarah Brooke (1683–1724), the daughter of Col. & Judge Thomas Brooke, Jr. (1660–1730), and 2) Barbara Dent (1676–1754), widow of her uncle, Col. & Gent William Dent Sr. (1660–1705).
 Ann Lee (1683–1732), who married 1) Hon. William Fitzhugh, Jr. (1679–1713) of "Eagle's Nest" in King George County and 2) Capt. Daniel McCarthy, Sr., Esq. (1679–1724), son of Dennis (MacCartee) McCarthy, Sr. (d. 1694) and Elizabeth Billington.  
 Francis Lee (1685-aft. 1754), who married Mary Barnell (1687-?).
 Thomas Lee (Virginia colonist) (1690–1750) who built now-historic Stratford Hall in Westmoreland County.  Thomas married Hannah Harrison Ludwell (1701–1750), daughter of Col. Philip Ludwell II (1672–1726) of Green Spring Plantation, and Hannah Harrison (1679–1731).
 Henry Lee I (1691–1747) of "Lee Hall" in Westmoreland County.  Henry married Mary Bland (1704–1764), daughter of Hon. Richard Bland, Sr. (1665–1720) and his second wife, Elizabeth Randolph (d. 1719).
 Arthur Lee (1693–1756), who married an unknown Sherrad.

Further reading
"The Lees of Virginia: An American Legacy," Lee Family Digital Archive (http://leearchive.wlu.edu/legacy/index.html : accessed 2014-04-10), Washington and Lee University, Lexington, Virginia.

"The Lees of Virginia," The Society of the Lees of Virginia (http://www.thesocietyoftheleesofva.org/index.php?option=com_content&view=article&id=4&Itemid=543 : accessed 2014-04-10), The Society of the Lees of Virginia, Alexandria, Virginia.

Paul C. Nagel, The Lees of Virginia: Seven Generations of an American Family, New York: Oxford University Press, 1990; specifically Ch. 2, "[Richard Lee II], The Scholar, 1664–1715," pp. 21–32; digital images, Google Books (https://books.google.com/books?id=UbyPlhZeKZIC&lpg=PP1&pg=PA21 : accessed 2014-04-10).

Louis B. Wright, "Richard Lee II, A Belated Elizabethan in Virginia," The Huntington Library Quarterly 2:1-35 (October 1938); San Marino, California: Huntington Library Press, 1938; digital facsimile, Lee Family Digital Archive (http://leearchive.wlu.edu/papers/manuscripts/library/wright.html : accessed 2014-04-10), Washington and Lee University, Lexington, Virginia.

References

1647 births
1715 deaths
House of Burgesses members
Lee family of Virginia
Virginia colonial people
American planters
People from Northumberland County, Virginia